The 1976–77 Wisconsin Badgers men's ice hockey team represented the University of Wisconsin–Madison in college ice hockey. In its tenth year under head coach Bob Johnson, the team compiled a 37–7–1 record (26–5–1 against Western Collegiate Hockey Association (WCHA) opponents) and outscored all opponents 264 to 161. The Badgers received the WCHA's automatic bid to the 1977 NCAA Division I Men's Ice Hockey Tournament by winning the 1977 WCHA Men's Ice Hockey Tournament, the only singular WCHA tournament champion over a 16-year period (1965 to 1981). They defeated the New Hampshire Wildcats in the Frozen Four semifinals and then beat WCHA- and Big Ten-rival Michigan Wolverines by a 6–5 score in overtime to win the national championship in Detroit, Michigan.

Goalie Julian Baretta was chosen as the Most Outstanding Player in the NCAA Tournament. He had two shutouts and a .905 save percentage for the season. The team's leading scorer was junior defenseman Craig Norwich with 18 goals, 65 assists, and 83 points. Norwich was the third defenseman (Bob Heathcott, 1952; Dan Lodboa, 1970) in NCAA history to lead his team in scoring while winning a National Title in the same season (the next occurrence was 2018).

Season
Head coach Bob Johnson returned to the program after taking a year off to coach the Team USA at the 1976 Winter Olympics in Innsbruck. The Olympic team finished a disappointing 5th-place after taking Silver in 1972 but the Badgers had fared even worse in Johnson's absence. Wisconsin went 12–24–1 under interim coach Bill Rothwell, compiling their first losing season since returning to varsity status in 1963 (The Badgers would not have another losing season until 1995–96).

Seeking to erase the previous year from their collective memories, the Badgers opened with a 6–7 overtime loss to dual conference rival Michigan but evened their record with an overtime win the following day. Over the next six games, Wisconsin scored no less than 5 times, winning each match until Michigan State handed them their second defeat of the season. After trading wins with several teams, and losing a match to HC Spartak Moscow, Wisconsin won 12 games in a row after the new year, rocketing up the standings to take first place in the WCHA. Wisconsin finished the regular season winning 26 of their 32 WCHA games to capture their first conference title and were led by Craig Norwich in scoring. Norwich's 63 points in WCHA play was good for third best across the conference and paced all defensemen by a wide margin.

Prior to the season, the NCAA instituted a new policy where they gave their tournament selection committee the ability to add up to four additional teams to the tournament. In response to this the WCHA changed their tournament format to have a solitary champion that would receive an automatic tournament bid rather than two co-champions who would both proceed to the national championship. This format would be in place for only the 1977 season and would revert to a co-champion system in 1978. Because of this Wisconsin would have to face three rounds of competitors rather than the customary two to win the WCHA tournament.

The Badgers played 8th-place Colorado College in the quarterfinals, who made the tournament over Michigan State based on tie-breakers. Though the Tigers had lost all four games to Wisconsin in the regular season they had done so with only seven fewer goals than the Badgers. In the two-game series Colorado College held Wisconsin's high-powered offense to only three goals twice, far below their average, but could only manage one score in each contest. In the semifinals the Badgers faced off against an upstart Minnesota squad that had defeated #2 seed Notre Dame in the opening round. The Golden Gophers were no match for the Badgers who took the series 17–8 and were set against Michigan in the championship series. Wisconsin got off to a great start, taking the first game 4–0, before cruising to a WCHA championship with a 5–4 win in the following game to take the series 9–4. The title gave Wisconsin an automatic bid to the 1977 NCAA tournament as the #1 western seed.

In their first game at the Olympia Stadium Wisconsin played New Hampshire, who possessed the #1 offense in the east. The two teams fought to a 3–3 tie after regulation but Julian Baretta kept everything out of the Badger's net in the extra frame and allowed Mike Eaves to score the game-winner. The championship match set Johnson's Badgers against Farrell's Wolverines for the seventh time that season. Wisconsin's offensive firepower was apparent from the start and the Badgers jumped out to a 3–0 lead on the strength of two power play goals. Michigan replied with two man-advantage markers of their own to cut the score to 3–2 but goals by Mike Meeker and Mark Johnson at the beginnings of the second and third periods rebuilt the Badger's 3-goal lead. The Wolverines, however, would not go away and Mark Miller scored 26 seconds after Johnson's second goal of the game. Dave Debol notched his second less than a minute later to cut Wisconsin's lead to 1 goal and it was completely erased with less than 6 minutes in regulation by  John Wayman. With the score tied and the Badger's reeling Baretta kept the score tied 5–5 and allowed Wisconsin to regain their footing as the two teams headed into overtime. In what turned out to be the shortest overtime period in NCAA championship history, Steve Alley backhanded the puck past Michigan netminder Rick Palmer and sent the Badger faithful into paroxysms of joy.

Wisconsin won its second National Title in 5 years on the strength of its power play, scoring a then-record 93 goals on the man-advantage over the course of the season. Only the 1980 Minnesota team has scored more (99). Mark Johnson set an NCAA record for freshman in assists (44) and points (80) and was named WCHA Freshman of the Year. Bob Johnson was named as the WCHA Coach of the Year while Julian Baretta and Craig Norwich earned both First Team All-WCHA and AHCA All-American honors. Mike Eaves was selected for the WCHA Second Team and an All-American while John Taft received a spot on the WCHA Second Team.

Standings

Schedule
During the season, Wisconsin compiled a 37–7–1 record, the best year the program has ever produced. Its schedule was as follows.

* Denotes overtime periods† WCHA game‡ Big Ten and WCHA game

National championship

(W1) Wisconsin vs. (W2) Michigan

Roster and scoring statistics

Goaltending Statistics

Players drafted into the NHL/WHA

1977 NHL amateur draft

1977 WHA Amateur Draft

See also
1977 NCAA Division I Men's Ice Hockey Tournament
List of NCAA Division I Men's Ice Hockey Tournament champions

References

Wisconsin Badgers men's ice hockey seasons
Wisconsin
Wisconsin
Wisconsin
Wisconsin
Wisconsin
Wisconsin